The Young Girl and the Monsoon is a 1999 comedy-drama film from Monsoon Productions and starring Terry Kinney and Ellen Muth. Writer-director James Ryan won Best Screenplay and the Gold Medal at the Wine Country Film Festival in 2000 for the film.

Plot
The Young Girl and the Monsoon centers around a fraught relationship between father and daughter. Hank, a 39-year-old photo-journalist (Kinney), has agreed to look after his 13-year-old daughter, Constance (Muth), for several weeks while his ex-wife goes on a holiday with her new husband. Hank has compartmentalized his life in such a way that his daughter doesn't know anything about his 26-year-old girlfriend, Erin (Avital). Suddenly Erin wants to marry Hank and have his children, but he can't cope, and drops her.

Just as Hank has a chance of winning a prestigious journalistic award, he finds his private life a little too much to handle. His daughter cannot understand how he can take war photographs and not do anything about what he photographs. She is going through the emotional swings of a growing adolescent and the scenes between Kinney and Muth as father and daughter are seen as the most impressive aspect of the film.

Cast
Terry Kinney as Hank
Ellen Muth as Constance
Mili Avital as Erin
Tim Guinee as Jack
Diane Venora as Giovanna

Release
The film was first shown at the AFI Film Festival on 25 October 1999, then at the Santa Barbara Film Festival on 4 March 2000, followed by the Los Angeles Independent Film Festival on 15 April 2000. It was released in New York City on 4 May 2001.

References

External links
 
 
 

1999 films
1999 comedy-drama films
1990s English-language films
Films set in New York City
American comedy-drama films
1990s American films